Cecil Noble Coleman Jr. (April 12, 1924 – February 27, 1988) was an American football player, coach, and college athletics administrator.  He served as the head football coach at Fresno State College—now known as California State University, Fresno—from 1959 to 1963, compiling a record of 37–13. Coleman was the athletic director at Fresno  State from 1963 to 1971, at Wichita State University from 1971 to 1972, and at the University of Illinois at Urbana–Champaign from 1972 to 1979.

Coleman played college football at Arizona State University, from which he graduated in 1950.  He was the starting quarterback for the Sun Devils and captain of the 1949 Arizona State Sun Devils football team.   Coleman began his coaching career in 1950 at North High School in Phoenix, Arizona.  He coached there for six seasons before moving on to Long Beach City College in 1956.  Coleman returned to his alma mater, Arizona State, in 1957 and worked as an assistant under head coach Dan Devine for two seasons.

Coleman died at the age of 63, on February 27, 1988, at the Carle Clinic in Urbana, Illinois.

Head coaching record

College

References

External links
 

1924 births
1988 deaths
American football quarterbacks
Arizona State Sun Devils football coaches
Arizona State Sun Devils football players
Fresno State Bulldogs athletic directors
Fresno State Bulldogs football coaches
Illinois Fighting Illini athletic directors
Wichita State Shockers athletic directors
High school football coaches in Arizona
Junior college football coaches in the United States